Itea is a genus of about 10 species of shrubs and small trees, commonly called sweetspires. The leaves are alternate. Flowers are small, with 5 sepals and 5 petals, borne in racemes or spikes.

The genus is native to eastern Asia, with one deciduous species from eastern North America.

Some species are grown in ornamental gardens for their long pendant and fragrant flower heads. These include the evergreen I. ilicifolia and I. yunnanensis from central and western China. A different, more upright growing characteristic can be found in the deciduous I. virginica of eastern North America.

Species include:
Itea chinensis Hook. & Arn. – Chinese sweetspire
Itea ilicifolia Oliv. – holly-leaved sweet spire
Itea japonica Oliv. – Japanese sweetspire
Itea oldhamii C. K. Schneid.
Itea parviflora Hemsl.
Itea rhamnoides (Harv.) Kubitzki
Itea virginica L. – Virginia sweetspire
Itea yunnanensis Franch.

References

 European Garden Flora, vol. 4.
 Hillier; Manual of Trees and Shrubs.

Saxifragales
Saxifragales genera